The Ford Probe is a liftback coupé produced by Ford, introduced in 1988 and produced until 1997. The Probe was the result of Ford's collaboration with its longtime Japanese partner Mazda, and both generations of Probe were derived from the front-wheel drive Mazda G platform that underpinned the Mazda Capella.

The Probe succeeded the Ford EXP, and the instrument cluster of the first-generation Probe and pop-up headlight mechanisms were borrowed from the FC Series RX-7.

Based on the Mazda MX-6 as a sport compact coupe, the Probe was intended to fill the market niche formerly occupied by the Capri in Europe, and it was originally intended to be the fourth generation Ford Mustang in the North American market as a direct competitor with the Acura Integra, Isuzu Piazza, Nissan 200SX, and the Toyota Celica. During that time, Ford's marketing team had deemed that a front-wheel drive platform (borrowed Mazda GD and GE platforms) would have lower costs for production, and also because the platform had been gaining popularity with consumers.

Mustang fans objected to the front-wheel drive configuration, Japanese engineering, and lack of a V8, so Ford began work on a new design for the Mustang instead. On March 17, 1997, Ford announced the discontinuation of the Probe.

Background 
Starting in the late 1970s, Ford and Ghia started exploring a series of futuristic designs with the "Probe" series of concept vehicles. The Probe I, first shown in 1979, was a wedge-shaped design that incorporated a number of drag-reducing features like covered rear wheels and pop-up headlights. This was followed the next year by a much more conventional looking Probe II, whose hatchback styling was also reminiscent of the pony cars. The 1981 Probe III was an advanced demonstrator with covered wheels, but its bodywork evolved into the more conventional Ford Sierra (or Merkur XR4Ti) and styling notes that were used on the Ford Taurus. The 1983 Probe IV was a more radical concept car with a low Cd (drag coefficient), and evolved into the equally radical 1985 Probe V.

After the 1979 energy crisis, the economic slump initiated by high fuel prices prompted Ford to give the Ford Mustang a major redesign. The new design would be based on a totally new platform introduced to Ford by Japanese automaker Mazda, who had been partnering with Ford since 1971, and whom Ford had owned a 25% stake in since 1979. Toshi Saito, a North American-based designer working for Ford, took the lead in envisioning styling directions for the front-wheel drive Mustang, and a design by Saito was chosen and finalized in early 1984. The project was then transferred to Mazda in Hiroshima, Japan and in internal Ford parlance, was referred to by the codename "ST-16". It was intended to gradually phase out the RWD Fox platform Mustang under the name "Mustang Classic" and have it eventually supplanted by the ST-16 as the "Mustang."

By 1985, Mazda acquired the former Ford Flat Rock Assembly Plant in Flat Rock, Michigan and intended to commence production of the two Mazda-badged GD platform cars for North America, the 626 along with the MX-6, and the ST-16, contracted by Ford, in 1987.

Christopher Sawyer, writing for AutoWeek magazine, in their issue for April 13, 1987, was the first to publicly reveal the existence of the ST-16 Mustang in a sensational report that featured an artist rendering on the issue's cover of a vehicle nearly identical to what would be released as the 1989 Ford Probe GT stating "Exclusive: The '89 Mustang," along with detailed technical reports about its Mazda origins and switch to front-wheel drive. The public outcry was immediate, with many Mustang fans and pony car purists detesting the ST-16's Japanese engineering, front-wheel drive platform and lack of a V8 engine, which were anathema to traditional Mustang buyers and enthusiasts. Ford Motor Company executives, along with many car magazines received strongly-worded letters of criticism decrying the decision.

Neil Ressler, the then-chief of small car engineering at Ford, spoke about the internal cultural differences at Ford Motor Company which led to a strong disagreement between two factions that had radically different notions about what the Mustang should be:

By 1987, Alex Trotman, the newly-appointed vice president in charge of Ford's North American operations, with strong urging from Ford Marketing vice president Bob Rewey, a dedicated performance enthusiast, decided that in the light of consumer outrage, the ST-16 would not make a suitable Mustang. At this point, somewhat ironically, Mustang sales, which were lackluster, grew substantially after the article's publication, out of fear that it would be the last opportunity to purchase a traditional RWD V8 Mustang. While Trotman approved the development of a RWD successor, there were many difficulties, notably that the engineering budget for the Mustang was spent on the ST-16 and Ford was still recovering from a financial crisis of the early 1980s that brought the company close to bankruptcy until the Taurus arrived.

John Coletti, Ford's small-car engineering manager and a vociferous opponent of the ST-16 Mustang, said of the project, "I would rather have seen the Mustang name die than put the Mustang name on the Probe ...".

Ken Dabrowski, Ford's small-car line manager, tapped Coletti to lead a skunkworks team that would develop a RWD Mustang successor with the understanding there would not be a full budget to create an entirely new car. Coletti's team heavily revised the 1979 Fox platform for the new car, which eventually became the fourth-generation Ford Mustang released for the 1994 model year.

However, production for the ST-16 was about to commence, meaning Ford had to put it on sale or lose its development budget along with further potential financial headaches if Ford would break its production contract with Mazda. It was decided that the ST-16 would be released as the Ford Probe in 1988, taking the name from Ford's line of futuristic concept vehicles, and be sold alongside the Mustang, which would continue production in its then-current form with minor refreshing. Instead of being aimed as a successor to the Mustang or as a rival to its traditional competitors, the Chevrolet Camaro and Pontiac Firebird, Ford would aim the Probe against popular imported sports coupes of the era such as the Toyota Celica and Honda Prelude.

Both generations of the Probe were sold in Japan as Fords, at Ford/Mazda sales channels called Autorama. Japanese models were not in compliance with Japanese Government regulations concerning exterior dimensions and engine displacement, resulting in Japanese buyers being held liable for additional taxes as a result.

The Probe was a sales success in its first model year, owing to its futuristic styling and enjoyable driving experience. In fact, demand exceeded supply in 1988, enough that buyers were paying list price or higher for a Probe, and Jim Mateja, the automotive columnist for the Chicago Tribune, urged potential Probe buyers who couldn't find a Probe to consider its sibling, the Mazda MX-6. Sales of the first-generation Probe were successful enough that Ford partnered with Mazda again, with further Ford engineering from the beginning of the project, to create a second-generation Probe for the 1993 model year developed alongside a second-generation Mazda MX-6. A proposed third-generation Probe, which would have been based on the Ford Mondeo instead of being Mazda-derived, was eventually released as the 1999 Mercury Cougar in the North American market to strengthen the Mercury brand. After disappointing sales of the Cougar and the waning popularity of front-wheel drive sport coupes in the late 1990s in favor of sport utility vehicles, Ford left the market segment with the 2002 discontinuation of the Cougar, and the 2003 discontinuation of the ZX2.

First generation (1988–1992) 

The first generation Ford Probe was based on the Mazda GD platform, and was powered by a 2.2 L SOHC 12-valve 4-cylinder Mazda F2 engine. It debuted in 1988 for the 1989 model year and was produced until 1992 in the United States in Flat Rock, Michigan. The Probe was available in several trim levels that differ depending on the market in which the vehicle was sold. In the United States, the Probe was available in GL, LX, and GT trim levels:
 The GL was the base model with the / F2 2.2 L 4-cylinder engine and few options. Most Probes sold in the United States were equipped with air conditioning.
 The LX added options for power locks, power windows, electrically adjusted exterior mirrors, a storage tray underneath the front passenger seat, as well as an optional flip-up moon roof. Starting in 1990, the LX was available with the 3.0 L "Vulcan" V6 engine, that was also used in the Ford Taurus, Ford Ranger, Ford Tempo, and Ford Aerostar. The LX package offered optional equipment, such as a single-disc CD player, and a digital instrument cluster coupled with a fuel economy computer installed in a hidden compartment on top of the center dashboard air conditioning vents.
It came with an IHI RHB5-VJ11 turbocharger and an intercooler to the intake tract, as well as a knock sensor and electronic boost controller to the engine-control system. The GT version also came with 4-wheel disc brakes with ABS, a 3-way adjustable suspension utilizing variable damping shocks, and a speed-sensitive variable-assist power steering (VAP). The Probe GT's suspension system was based on a Mazda design, but its tuning was different and included nitrogen-gas pressurized front and rear struts, with stabilizer bars.

The 1991 Probe was given a 4-star crash rating in collision tests conducted by the U.S. National Highway Traffic Safety Administration.

Engine specifications

Production Figures

Second generation (1993–1997) 

The Ford and Mazda design teams merged once again to give the Ford Probe a complete redesign for the 1993 model year. As before, the Probe was to share its under-structure with Mazda's MX-6 and 626. Mazda engineered the engine, transmission, and chassis, while Ford engineered the body and interior. Technically, the second generation Probe is 60% Mazda and 40% Ford. Despite the car being extended and widened  it was  lighter than the first generation Probe. The second generation Probe was introduced in August 1992 as a 1993 model. As first planned during 1992, it finally went on sale in Europe in the spring of 1994, filling the gap left there by Ford in that market sector since the demise of the Capri seven years earlier. The Capri had regularly been one of Britain's 10 best selling cars throughout the 1970s, but its popularity declined in the early 1980s as Ford launched high performance versions of the Fiesta, Escort and Sierra hatchbacks. Such was the falling demand for this type of car that by 1986, when the end of Capri production was announced, Ford decided against launching a direct replacement.

The second-generation Probe was designed by a team led by Mimi Vandermolen, who led the interior design of the 1986 Ford Taurus. In 1987, Vandermolen became the first female designer to be the design executive of small cars for an automobile manufacturer, and Vandermolen designed the Probe to improve the driving experience for women, stating "If I can solve all the problems inherent in operating a vehicle for a woman, that'll make it that much easier for a man to use."

However, the late 1980s and early 1990s saw the sales of affordable sports cars recover, first with a rising demand for Japanese built models like the Honda Prelude, Nissan Silvia, Mitsubishi Eclipse, and Toyota Celica, and then with the Volkswagen Corrado and the Vauxhall/Opel Calibra from Ford's direct competitor General Motors. By 1992, Ford had decided that there was now justifiable demand in Europe for a new affordable sports coupe to be launched.

Ford had been hoping to sell around 20,000 Probes each year in Britain as the car market recovered from the effects of the recession from 1992, but in the three years it was sold there, a total of just over 15,000 were sold - around a quarter of the projected figure for that length of time. Imports ceased during 1997, and its Cougar successor - launched a year later - was even less successful, being imported to Europe for just two years.

By February 2016, just 718 examples of the Probe were still in use in Britain.

The base model started at just over US $13,000 and came standard with the 2.0 L Mazda FS 16-valve 4-cylinder engine, performance instrument cluster with tachometer and full gauge complement, and an electronic AM/FM stereo. The sportier GT model started at $15,504 and came standard with the 2.5 L Mazda K engine KL-DE 24-valve V6, low profile P225/50VR16 91V Goodyear VR50 Gatorback tires, 4-wheel disc brakes, unique front and rear fascias, fog lights, 5-spoke aluminum wheels, leather-wrapped steering wheel, and driver-seat power lumbar/seat back side bolster adjustment. Both engines featured dual overhead cam designs with the choice of a 5-speed manual transmission or a 4-speed automatic transmission.

Two automatic transmissions were available in the Probe. At first both engines shared the same automatic transmission, the Ford F-4EAT transmission, but from 1994 onwards this changed.  The V6 engine continued to use the 4EAT, but the 2.0 L I4 engine used a different automatic transmission, the Ford CD4E transmission. It was sourced by Ford, and manufactured at Ford's Batavia Transmission plant in Batavia, Ohio.

A new SE (Sport Edition) trim level was available for 1995 and 1996. It included the GT front fascia (without fog lamps), unique  aluminum wheels, P205/55R15 BSW and Sport Edition "SE" nomenclature.

In a coast to coast road test by Automobile Magazine in search of the best cars in the world, the Probe GT scored third place, behind an $80,000 Mercedes-Benz and an $80,000 BMW. In the article, the Probe listed at about $15,000.

Special editions
For 1993 and 1994, Ford offered a "SE" appearance package on the base model Probe. The package offered 3 spoke swirl-style alloy wheels, the GT model's ground effects, and the GT model's front bumper. Unlike the base model, buyers were able to opt for power windows and mirrors on the SE package. Appearance wise, the only noticeable differences from the GT model were the wheels, "SE" nomenclature, rear bumper w/o air slot and lack of fog lights. "SE" was an appearance package and not an actual model or trim level. "SE" became a trim level in 1995 and was the middle-grade model in the Probe lineup between base and GT models.

In 1994, Ford released a limited edition of the Probe, marketed as the Probe "Feature Car", but officially called the "GT Plus" package. This special package is better known to the general public and enthusiast community as the Probe "Wild Orchid Edition". Included on this limited appearance package was Wild Orchid exterior paint, "PROBE" badge on floor mats outlined in Wild Orchid, black cloth bucket seats with unique Wild Orchid inserts, and the "PROBE" badge on the rear outlined in Wild Orchid. This package was offered in 1994 only, and was exclusive to GT models. After dropping the Probe Feature Car after only a year of production, Ford carried over the Wild Orchid exterior color for the 1995 model year which was available on all Probe models.

In 1997, a "GTS" package was offered on the Probe GT. It was essentially nothing more than an appearance package, as performance was identical to the GT, but differences with the exterior were distinct. Dual racing stripes available in either white or black started at the top edge of the front bumper and continued on to the back lip of the hatch, terminating just below the center light reflector on the rear bumper. A chrome plated version of the GT's directional "swirlie" wheels and a spoiler were also included in the package, as well as having a "blank" center reflector which lacked "GT" lettering as the regular GT models have. The "GTS" was an appearance package and not an actual model or trim level. Very few Probes were produced with the GTS package and are considered today to be extremely rare.

Models/trim levels
 Base • 1993–1995 ; 1997
 SE • 1995–1996
 GT • 1993–1997

In most other markets outside North America, trim levels were labeled as simply 16v (I4) and 24v (V6).

Appearance packages
 SE • 1993–1994
 GT Plus (Wild Orchid Edition) • 1994
 GTS • 1997

Engine specifications

Year to year changes

1994
The 1994 Ford Probe becomes one of the first production cars to have dual airbags as standard equipment
The dashboard gets a major overhaul. It now used completely different materials, and the right side is redesigned to house a passenger airbag
Ford introduces the Probe in the European market
Foglights are slightly redesigned and now made by a different company
The stripe on the dashboard is gone, but remains on the interior panels
The stripe color on Probe GT's door panels are changed from red to the color of the car's interior
New Ford CD4E automatic transaxle for base and SE models
"V6 DOHC 24 VALVE" emblem on engine intake manifold is no longer indented into the manifold and is now raised
The button to raise the pop up headlights is removed but the wiring remained,the button could be added to restore function
Fog light button on GT's is slightly redesigned

1995
Redesigned tail lights; the base/SE models are outlined in black, the GT's are outlined in red
SE becomes a trim level/model
The wiring to raise the headlights without turning them on is removed
SE model no longer has the GT's ground effects/side skirts
Distributors are redesigned for better reliability
New alloy wheels for SE and GT (3-spoke 15-inch directional for SE, 5-spoke 16-inch directional "swirlies" for GT)
Two interior colors are dropped, Red and blue
Interior panels no longer have a stripe on them
Door panels are redesigned and are now a one piece design. GT models get a cloth or leather insert on the door panels.
Cloth seats are redesigned and are given a unique "spider web" pattern
GT models get the option of tan/saddle leather interior
Cup holders are slightly redesigned
GT models receive red center reflector with 'GT' logo between tail lights. License plate indent moved down onto bumper.
GT decal on rear bumper replaced with metal '24v' badge
Rear bumper is redesigned
Exterior mirrors are redesigned
Heated exterior mirrors option is dropped
Graphic equalizer is dropped

1996
"PROBE" badge stamped on rear windows is gone
Door ding guards no longer are extended onto the fenders
Base model dropped; SE is now the standard model
Probe GT gets the 1995 base/SE's black outlined tail lights
Illuminated exterior door locks are dropped
Tan/saddle color interiors are now available in cloth
Spoilers are redesigned
Floor lighting is dropped
"GT" center reflector above bumper on GT models is now outlined in black
Probe GT gets more refined suspension to improve ride. Ride height is now higher and handling is different as a result.
Cloth seats are redesigned again and get new fabric
Probe GT now has spoilers standard
Front seats are redesigned again 
Rear seats are redesigned
Probe GT steering wheel's leather is no longer perforated
New seat belts with automatic locking retractors
Rear ashtray and map pocket on the passenger door of GT models are dropped
Rear windshield wiper dropped as an option
OBD-II compliant

1997
SE model is dropped ; base model returns and has the GT's front bumper
Cloth/leather inserts on GT door panels are removed
Base models get wheel covers from the Mazda 626, with 15-inch 3-spoke directional alloys from 95 and 96 Probe SE optional 
Or optional 16-inch 5-spoke directional rims "swirlies"
Rear windshield wiper returns as an option
ABS is no longer standard on GT models and is now an option
GT logos behind the front wheel wells have new letter styling
Probe GT no longer has "24v" badge beside the "PROBE" badge
Side door intrusion beams redesigned to meet 1997 Federal Side Impact Standards
GTS appearance package added to the GT's option list
Last year for the Probe, with the last Probe being manufactured on June 20, 1997

Production Figures

Proposed third generation 
The last Probe was built on June 20, 1997. A third-generation model, using the same platform as the Ford Contour, was under development intended for release in mid-1998 as a 1999 model. When Ford decided to discontinue the Probe, this new design became the next-generation Mercury Cougar. The name change was intended to attract younger buyers into Mercury showrooms, but this proved unsuccessful. The Escort ZX2, released shortly after the discontinuation of the Probe, was considered the Probe's successor. In June 1998, Ford released what would have been the new Probe as the 1999 Mercury Cougar.

Awards 
The Probe GT was Motor Trend magazine's Car of the Year for 1993. It also made Car and Driver magazine's Ten Best list for 1989, 1993, and 1994.

The NASCAR Dash Series version of a 1990 Ford Probe driven by Jeffrey Collier set a new track record at Daytona International Speedway February 13, 1990 with a speed of 166.553 mph. That record still stands as the fastest closed course lap for a non-turbo 4-cylinder powered car.

References

External links

 Ford Probe 24v – Information, documents, pictures, about Ford Probe 24v of 1993

Probe
Cars introduced in 1988
1990s cars
Compact cars
Front-wheel-drive sports cars
Hatchbacks
Sport compact cars
Motor vehicles manufactured in the United States
Cars discontinued in 1997